Associazione Sportiva Dilettantistica Astrea, simply known as Astrea, is an Italian association football club located in Rome, Lazio. It currently plays in Eccellenza Lazio.

History 
The club was founded in 1948.

Astrea is the team of the Italian Polizia Penitenziaria, the police corp in charge of the control of prisons.

Colors and badge 
Its colors are white and blue.

Honours
 Coppa Italia Dilettanti:
Champion: 1996–97

External links
 Official homepage

Football clubs in Rome
Association football clubs established in 1948
Serie C clubs
1948 establishments in Italy
Football clubs in Italy